Irene Jelagat (born 10 December 1988) is a Kenyan middle-distance runner who specializes in the 1500 metres.

She won the gold medal at the 2006 World Junior Championships, with a personal best time of 4:08.88 minutes, and finished fifth at the 2008 African Championships.

Jelegat represented Kenya in the 1500 m at the 2008 Beijing Olympics, but did not progress beyond the heats stage. She competed at the 2009 World Championships, but she fell and did not advance past 1500 metres heats. She came fifth at the 2010 IAAF World Indoor Championships with a personal best run of 4:09.57 minutes. She improved upon this with a run of 4:07.45 minutes for third place at the Sparkassen Cup in February 2011.

References

External links

Tilastopaja profile

1988 births
Living people
Kenyan female middle-distance runners
Athletes (track and field) at the 2008 Summer Olympics
Olympic athletes of Kenya
Athletes (track and field) at the 2010 Commonwealth Games
African Games gold medalists for Kenya
African Games medalists in athletics (track and field)
World Athletics record holders (relay)
Athletes (track and field) at the 2011 All-Africa Games
Commonwealth Games competitors for Kenya
20th-century Kenyan women
21st-century Kenyan women